The Lost Husband is a 2020 American romance film written and directed by Vicky Wight and starring Leslie Bibb and Josh Duhamel. It is based on Katherine Center's 2013 novel of the same name. The film was released to video on demand on April 10, 2020 by Quiver Distribution and Redbox Entertainment.

Plot
Libby loses her husband and her home and finds herself a single mother of Abby and Tank, with no place to live. She moves in with her mother, Marsha, an overly critical woman. Marsha has always had a rocky relationship with Libby. After six months, Marsha says that Libby must leave. Libby and her two children move to Aunt Jean's goat farm in central Texas looking for a fresh start. Aunt Jean instructs James O'Connor, her farm manager, to teach Libby the ropes of keeping up the farm. Libby is not thrilled about the idea, but accepts because she needs a job. Slowly, Libby and the children start getting used to their new life at the farm.

Libby develops her farm skills and begins bonding with James. The children also bond with James, who enjoys playing with Tank and teaching Abby how to defend herself from a bully at her new school who picks on her for having a limp, which she got in the car accident that killed her father. Abby gets suspended from school for punching the bully and, although Libby is upset with James for teaching her karate, she realizes Abby trusted James to tell her about the bullying issues while she had been too afraid to talk about it with Libby and adding to her stress. Later in the film Abby is suspended again for using curse words on the bully, who had hit her in the head. James drives Libby to school to pick Abby up, and when he runs into the bully, he threatens him.

The family also meets and bonds with Jean's boyfriend, Russ McAllen, and his granddaughter, Sunshine. One night, Sunshine takes Libby to an abandoned house which she says belongs to Jean, but she hasn't lived there since her husband, Frank, died. Sunshine suggests Libby try to communicate with her dead husband. Although Libby doesn't take the idea of talking with the dead too seriously, she does have a sentimental and raw moment delivering a monologue as if she were talking to Danny. The fire they had made suddenly goes out, leaving Libby thinking maybe Danny was in fact able to hear her. Throughout the next days we slowly see Libby acquire a sense of closure about her husband's death.

During Jean's birthday party, more is learned about James. After five years of marriage, his wife fell for another man and asked for a divorce. A few months after the divorce, she had a stroke and required full-time care from a nurse. James had stepped in to help her constantly, as her new boyfriend had left her as soon as things got hard.

One day, Libby decides to visit the big abandoned house again and finds a picture of her as a baby with Jean and Frank. She confronts Aunt Jean about it, finding out that Marsha had abandoned her as a newborn and left her at that house at the care of her grandparents. However, due to their delicate health, it was Jean who had cared for her until Marsha came back four years later for the grandmother's funeral. Libby drives to Marsha's home to confront her about it. Marsha says she was only 18 at the time and needed time to mature.

Libby goes back to the farm and asks Jean to let her restore the house, so she can live there with her children, assuring her that she will continue to take care of the farm. As much as she has lost during the past year, Libby has finally found a place that feels like home. In the end scene, we see Libby fixing the house when James comes by to tell her he had been helping his ex-wife move in with her parents, so they could take care of her. Bringing closure to that chapter in his life, James tells Libby he is back and ready to continue working on the farm. They kiss.

Cast

Reception
The site's critical consensus reads, "It won't set hearts a-flutter for anyone who isn't a dedicated romantic, but audiences in the mood for love might like The Lost Husband." Tara McNamara of Common Sense Media awarded the film three stars out of five. Brian Tallerico of RogerEbert.com awarded the film two and a half stars.

References

External links
 
 

2020 films
2020 romance films
2020s English-language films
American romance films
Films based on American novels
Films based on romance novels
Quiver Distribution films
2020s American films